The Pirate Parrot is a costumed mascot of the Pittsburgh Pirates of Major League Baseball. He was introduced in 1979 in response to the popularity of the Phillie Phanatic introduced one year earlier, as the Pirates and Philadelphia Phillies had a fierce intrastate rivalry at the time.

History
The character of a parrot was derived from the classic story Treasure Island by Robert Louis Stevenson, most notably the one owned by Long John Silver named "Captain Flint".

The Parrot debuted on April Fools' Day, 1979 when he "hatched" at Three Rivers Stadium. That year, the "We Are Family" Bucs went on to win the World Series, with the Parrot serving as somewhat of a cheerleader to the crowd along the way.

His initial appearance bore more resemblance to The San Diego Chicken, being thinner and "meaner". He wore more pirate-related items such as a captain's hat and vest, and often waved a Jolly Roger around on a flag pole. Shortly before the Pittsburgh drug trials of 1985 (see below), the Parrot was redesigned to his current appearance, gaining weight and making him more goofy-looking in order for him to appeal to children more. In addition, he dropped the traditional pirate garb in favor of wearing a Pirates jersey and backwards baseball cap. In 1995, the Parrot was briefly paired with a secondary mascot, the Buccaneer, who was quickly dropped.

The Parrot has become a staple within the Pittsburgh region, often appearing at events and Pirates team functions. He often appears in ads for the team on television. He has been embraced more in Pittsburgh among older fans than Steely McBeam of the Pittsburgh Steelers, and along with Iceburgh of the Pittsburgh Penguins serves as one of two bird-based mascots in Pittsburgh.  In May 1986 the Pirate Parrot joined in the Pittsburgh section of Hands Across America.

The three Pittsburgh mascots have been known to "fight" each other. In 2008, a parody attack ad based on the then-upcoming Presidential election was made to "attack" the Parrot, due to the Pirates then-16 consecutive losing seasons while the Penguins went on to lose in the Stanley Cup Finals to the Detroit Red Wings earlier in the year. (The Pens would win the Stanley Cup the following year.) The following year, all three mascots took part in a groundbreaking of an expansion of the National Aviary in Pittsburgh, with Steely McBeam tossing dirt at the Parrot's feet.

In some cases, the Parrot has accompanied the Pirates on road trips if the game is in close proximity to Pittsburgh. For instance, the Parrot appeared at two games for the Pirates during a weekend interleague series against the Cleveland Indians in Cleveland in 2012, with the Parrot having friendly interactions with the Indians mascot, Slider, and even assisting Slider in interfering with the Indians Hot Dog Race, much like what the Parrot does with the Great Pierogi Race.

According to the Parrot's biography on the Pirates official website, the Parrot hopes to eventually be inducted into the Mascot Hall of Fame. As of 2015, he has yet to be listed as a candidate, much less inducted.

Impact on the Pittsburgh drug trials

	
Kevin Koch, the original portrayer of the Pirate Parrot, was later discovered to be high from cocaine during several games as the Pirate Parrot. He was also found to be the "middle man" between players and drug dealers, introducing them to cocaine. Koch, who has lived a private life since, has shown regret for doing cocaine and sharing it with the players. Despite the scandal, the Pirates kept the Parrot, although Koch himself was fired.

References 

Major League Baseball team mascots
Pittsburgh Pirates
Mascots introduced in 1979
Bird mascots
Fictional parrots
Culture of Pittsburgh